Give Us Clean Hands may refer to:

"Give Us Clean Hands", a song by Charmaine from All About Jesus
"Give Us Clean Hands", a song by Kutless from It Is Well
"Give Us Clean Hands", a song by Mark Schultz from WOW Worship: Red
"Give Us Clean Hands", a song by Chris Tomlin